Midlands Provincial Hospital is a Provincial government funded hospital in the Dr Beyers Naudé Local Municipality area in Graaff-Reinet in South Africa.

The hospital departments include Emergency department, Paediatric ward, Maternity ward, Obstetrics, Gynaecology Services, Out Patients Department, Surgical Services, Medical Services, Operating Theatre & CSSD Services, Pharmacy, Anti-Retroviral (ARV) treatment for HIV/AIDS, Post Trauma Counseling Services, Dentistry, Physiotherapy, Occupational Services, Laboratory Services, X-ray Services, Laundry Services and Kitchen Services.

Hospitals in the Eastern Cape
Sarah Baartman District Municipality